AA-12 may refer to:
R-77, a medium-range, air-to-air tactical missile
Atchisson AA-12, an automatic combat shotgun